Old Shawneetown is a village in Gallatin County, Illinois, United States. As of the 2010 census, the village had a population of 193, down from 278 at the 2000 census. Located along the Ohio River, Shawneetown served as an important United States government administrative center for the Northwest Territory. The village was devastated by the Ohio River flood of 1937. The village's population was moved several miles inland to New Shawneetown.

History
At least one record suggests that a village was established here by the Pekowi Shawnee led by Peter Chartier about 1758. In early November 1803, Lewis and Clark are believed to have stopped at Old Shawneetown on their way to Fort Massac, just down the Ohio River.

After the American Revolution, Shawneetown served as an important United States government administrative center for the Northwest Territory. Shawneetown and Washington, D.C., share the distinction of being the only towns chartered by the United States government.

Old Shawneetown is the site of the first bank chartered in Illinois, in 1816. Originally in a log cabin, it was replaced in 1822 with a brick structure (only the second one in the town) now known as the John Marshall House.

Local legend states that the Shawneetown Bank refused to buy the first bonds issued by the city of Chicago on the grounds that no city located that far from a navigable river could survive.

Another historic bank building, the Bank of Illinois, was constructed in 1839-41 to house the offices of the Bank of Illinois at Shawneetown. It later housed numerous other financial institutions before it was closed in the 1930s. This fine example of Greek Revival architecture survives as the Shawneetown Bank State Historic Site.

Residents long remembered the visit by Gilbert du Motier, Marquis de Lafayette of France to the city on May 8, 1825, as a high point for the early community's social history.

After the Great Flood of 1937, many residents moved to the current location of Shawneetown. The old courthouse was torn down and a new Gallatin County Courthouse was constructed in 1939.

Geography
Old Shawneetown is located in southeastern Gallatin County at  (37.698197, -88.136857), on the northwest bank of the Ohio River. Illinois Route 13 passes through the village. To the east it crosses the Shawneetown Bridge over the Ohio, becoming Kentucky Route 56 and leading  to Morganfield, Kentucky.

In 2019, Old Shawneetown was featured on PBS NewsHour in a segment on communities subjected to repeated flooding.  Because of the town's historically flood-prone location, it is prohibitively difficult to insure, and some researchers have recommended a total relocation of the remaining residents as a preventative policy.

Demographics

As of the census of 2000, there were 278 people, 100 households, and 69 families residing in the village. The racial makeup of the village was 99.64% White and 0.36% Native American. Hispanic or Latino of any race were 1.08% of the population.

There were 100 households, out of which 36.0% had children under the age of 18 living with them, 44.0% were married couples living together, 20.0% had a female householder with no husband present, and 31.0% were non-families. 24.0% of all households were made up of individuals, and 7.0% had someone living alone who was 65 years of age or older.  The average household size was 2.78 and the average family size was 3.36.

In the village, the population was spread out, with 33.8% under the age of 18, 8.3% from 18 to 24, 27.0% from 25 to 44, 22.7% from 45 to 64, and 8.3% who were 65 years of age or older.  The median age was 32 years. For every 100 females, there were 98.6 males.  For every 100 females age 18 and over, there were 93.7 males.

The median income for a household in the village was $18,214, and the median income for a family was $20,625. Males had a median income of $25,625 versus $13,750 for females. The per capita income for the village was $9,379.  About 33.3% of families and 39.4% of the population were below the poverty line, including 60.6% of those under the age of eighteen and 33.3% of those 65 or over.

Notable people 

 Claudia Cassidy, music and drama critic for the Chicago Tribune
 Peter Chartier, Shawnee Indian chief
 Robert G. Ingersoll, orator
 Michael Kelly Lawler, Union Army officer
 John Alexander McClernand, Union Army general and U.S. congressman
 John McLean, U.S. senator and congressman
 William W. Wilshire, U.S. congressman
 Bluford Wilson, Union Army officer
 James Harrison Wilson, Union Army general

See also
Illinois Salines
List of cities and towns along the Ohio River

References

Further reading
 1887. History of Gallatin, Saline, Hamilton, Franklin and Williamson Counties, Illinois. Chicago: Goodspeed Publishing Co.
 Musgrave, Jon, ed. 2002. Handbook of Old Gallatin County and Southeastern Illinois. Marion, Ill.: IllinoisHistory.com. 464 pages.
 Musgrave, Jon. 2004, Rev. ed. 2005. Slaves, Salt, Sex & Mr. Crenshaw: The Real Story of the Old Slave House and America's Reverse Underground R.R.. Marion, Ill.: IllinoisHistory.com. 608 pages.
 Waggoner, Horace Q., interviewer. 1978. "Lucille Lawler Memoir" Shawneetown Bank Project. Sangamon State University. Springfield, Ill.
 

Villages in Gallatin County, Illinois
Villages in Illinois
Illinois populated places on the Ohio River